Óscar Carmelo Sánchez Zambrana (July 16, 1971 – November 23, 2007) was a Bolivian sweeper who played for the Bolivia national football team in the 1994 FIFA World Cup held in the United States. Born in Cochabamba, he was capped 78 times by Bolivia and scored 6 goals, between 1994 and 2006. He was the captain of the national team several times. He made his debut for the national side on April 20, 1994 in a friendly match in Bucharest against Romania.

At club level he began his professional career with The Strongest in 1991. After five seasons with the atigrados, he was transferred to Argentine club Gimnasia y Esgrima de Jujuy, where he built a solid reputation as a temperamental and tough defender with scoring ability. His impressive displays rewarded him with a transfer to giant club Independiente in the winter of 1998. On his return to Bolivia in 2000, he would spend two more periods with The Strongest, and one with Bolívar. In 2007, he had one of his kidneys removed due to the discovery of a tumour, which proved to be malignant. After the operation he continued playing, but was forced to retire soon thereafter. He was offered the manager position of The Strongest, with which he attained an impressive undefeated streak. In October 2007, his weak health forced him to quit that position too. Sánchez died on November 23, 2007.

References

External links
 Argentine Primera statistics at Fútbol XXI  
 International RSSSF
 

1971 births
2007 deaths
Sportspeople from Cochabamba
Bolivian footballers
Bolivia international footballers
Bolivian expatriate footballers
1994 FIFA World Cup players
1995 Copa América players
1997 Copa América players
1999 Copa América players
1999 FIFA Confederations Cup players
The Strongest players
Club Bolívar players
Club Atlético Independiente footballers
Gimnasia y Esgrima de Jujuy footballers
Bolivian Primera División players
Argentine Primera División players
Expatriate footballers in Argentina
Bolivian football managers
The Strongest managers
Deaths from cancer in Bolivia
Deaths from kidney cancer
Association football defenders